Columnea linearis is a species of Gesneriaceae that is native to Costa Rica, Nicaragua, and Belize.

References

External links
 
 

linearis
Plants described in 1858
Flora of Costa Rica